Holy Angels Academy was a former all-girls, private, Roman Catholic high school in Buffalo, New York.

Background
Holy Angels Academy was established in 1861.

It was founded by the Grey Nuns of the Sacred Heart. Its current address is on Hertel Avenue in North Buffalo, but was founded on the West Side of Buffalo.

On April 30, 2013, Holy Angels staff announced that 2012-2013 would be the final academic year. An e-mail to parents stated, "The Board of Trustees and the Grey Nuns of the Sacred Heart made this decision after many weeks of discussion, data analysis, and deliberation among themselves and with school leaders."

The Holy Angels building is now occupied by the Charter School for Applied Technologies middle school.

Academics
In 2009, Holy Angels Academy was ranked 11th out of 131 Western New York high schools in terms of academic performance.

See also
 Holy Angels Church (Buffalo, New York)
 Charter School for Applied Technologies

Notes and references

https://archive.today/20130630161319/http://www.wkbw.com/news/local/Holy-Angels-Academy-to-Close-in-June-205504171.html

External links
 School Website

Defunct Catholic secondary schools in New York (state)
Educational institutions established in 1861
Educational institutions disestablished in 2013
Girls' schools in New York (state)
High schools in Buffalo, New York
1861 establishments in New York (state)